Knud Erik Friis (23 January 1916 – 11 October 1983) was a Danish cyclist. He competed in the team pursuit event at the 1936 Summer Olympics.

References

External links
 

1916 births
1983 deaths
Danish male cyclists
Olympic cyclists of Denmark
Cyclists at the 1936 Summer Olympics
Cyclists from Copenhagen